was a politician and cabinet minister in the pre-war Empire of Japan.

Biography
Shimada was born in the city of Gōtsu in Shimane Prefecture Japan. In 1900, he graduated from the law department of Tokyo Imperial University, and found employment as a journalist for magazines. He was elected to a seat in the Tokyo City assembly in 1903; however, in 1905 he accepted a position as a lecturer at a law school in Yunnan Province, China. He returned to Japan in 1907.
In 1911, Shimada opened a legal office and began work as a lawyer. He was elected to the Lower House of the Diet of Japan in the 1912 General Election as an independent, but joined the Rikken Seiyūkai the following year. He was re-elected nine times, and rose within the Rikken Seiyūkai to eventually become Secretary-General of the party from 1937 to 1939.

In 1931, Prime Minister Tsuyoshi Inukai selected Shimada as Director-General of the Cabinet Legislation Bureau. He joined the cabinet under the administration of Prime Minister Kōki Hirota in 1936 as Minister of Agriculture and Forestry. He accepted the same portfolio again in January 1940 under the Yonai administration, and continued to hold that post into the 2nd Konoe administration.  As with all other Japanese politicians, Tawara was forced to join the Taisei Yokusankai created by Konoe in 1940.

During World War II, Shimada accepted the cabinet position of Minister of Agriculture and Commerce under the Koiso administration. From June to September 1945, he served as Speaker of the Lower House.

Immediately following the surrender of Japan in 1945, he became one of the founding members of the Nihon Shimpo-tō political party. However, as with all members of the wartime administration, he was purged from public office by the American occupation authorities in 1946.

Shimada died on 21 December 1947.

References
Yamashita, Samuel Hideo. Leaves from an autumn of emergencies. University of Hawaii Press. (2005) 

|-

 
|-

 
|-

 

1877 births
1947 deaths
People from Shimane Prefecture
University of Tokyo alumni
Government ministers of Japan
Imperial Rule Assistance Association politicians
Rikken Seiyūkai politicians
Members of the House of Representatives (Empire of Japan)